Fiu Matamua Lausiva Nu'ualiitia Loimata II (1941/2 - 13 January 2021) was a Samoan politician and member of the Legislative Assembly of Samoa. He was a member of the Human Rights Protection Party.

Loimata was elected to the Fono at the 1996 election. He was not re-elected in 2001.

References

1940s births
Year of birth uncertain
2021 deaths
Members of the Legislative Assembly of Samoa